MTV Asia Hitlist is an Asian chart show or countdown on MTV Asia, produced by MTV Asia and hosted by MTV VJs, which first aired in 1996. It resembles the MTV US show TRL, which also featured music videos in a countdown. From 1996 to 1999, the show presented the Top 20 videos in Asia, lasting for two hours with advertisements. However, in 2000, it was reduced to the Top 10, now consuming only one hour. A year later, the Top 20 was brought back this time lasting only one hour as not all the videos were shown. "One Sweet Day" by Mariah Carey and Boyz II Men was the first single to top the charts.

History
It was believed that MTV Asia had yet to come up with an update as to what shows can bring viewers' attention to the Asian version of MTV. Since MTV Asia had less shows, the producers decided to create a countdown that resembled the Billboard Hot 100, however, having Asia as the direct source of popularity. The show became as instant success, as different genres were able to enter the countdown due to Asia's diversity to music. Artists like the Backstreet Boys, Jennifer Lopez, Mariah Carey, the Spice Girls, Britney Spears, and Green Day were known to be chart toppers in the Hitlist.

Reformat
After four years of having the Top 20 videos being broadcast, the network decided to lessen the number of videos to ten since there were many shows to accommodate. In 2000, only the Top 10 were shown, though people speculated that the producers tabulated the Top 20, since there were "bubbling up" videos that were shown to the audience. After a year, they resumed the Top 20, this time, acquiring only one hour, since not all videos from the Top 20 were shown.

Affiliations
The MTV Asia Hitlist is based on viewers' requests, album and singles sales, radio airplay and music downloads. Determining the singles that enter the Top 20 is in cooperation of the record labels and companies, Nielsen Soundscan, and the Asian 100 Singles Airplay. In Asia, the MTV Network works in cooperation with extensive research from local MTV stations like MTV Indonesia, MTV India, MTV Philippines, MTV Mainland China, and MTV Japan.

Policies
Policies in the Asia Hitlist have been made in accordance to charting songs in the countdown. Several songs may have been given consideration due to its extreme reception in the Asian market. Various reasons for charting songs have special cases, and are deliberated by the makers of the MTV Asia Hitlist.

Multiple Entries
Artists may have multiple entries in the chart, and may occupy the top positions at the same time, which happened in 2002, where the Top 3 songs in one week were all of Mandy Moore's songs from her movie "A Walk to Remember." "Cry," "Someday We'll Know," and "Only Hope" occupied the Top 3 positions in May 2002, and all songs were able to top the charts, earning Moore her first three #1 singles.

Scope Release
Regardless of the scope of release, Asia was exempted from US and UK release. One example is "Born To Make You Happy" and "From The Bottom Of My Broken Heart" by Britney Spears. "Born To Make You Happy" was released in the UK and other parts of the globe except for the US, while "From The Bottom Of my Broken Heart" was only released in the US. In the Asia Hitlist, both singles charted with the former topping the chart for 2 weeks, and the latter peaking at #2.

Double-sided Releases
Double-sided releases were not considered to be a major factor in Asian releases. It was noted that each of the singles chart differently, since both songs totally differed from another. One example is the double-sided single "Mama" and "Who Do You Think You Are" by the Spice Girls. Considered a double-sided single in the UK, it charted in the Asia Hitlist as two different entries, with each video justifying its eligibility to chart. However, in the case of Mariah Carey's "Always Be My Baby," which was double-sided with "Slipping Away," the former charted as the official release excluding the latter from gaining popularity. "Always Be My Baby" became Carey's #1 hit while "Slipping Away" was disregarded and was not released.

Video Accompaniment
Charting songs have been completely eligible when there is an accompanying music video, which is used for commercial release. The first song to chart without a commercial video release was "Incomplete" by Sisqo, his second number one. The single didn't have an accompanying video for a release, but eight weeks later after charting, an official video was released. The song was not aired during the period wherein there was no accompanying video, and a picture of Sisqo was shown during recaps of the countdown. It was only after it fell from the top spot that that video was released, thus the airplay of the song was eligible.

Remixes
In the early years of the Hitlist, remixes were eligible to chart if it was a dance remix or "radio" mix of an album's cut. It means that a remix's eligibility to chart depends entirely on the original version, since both versions are credited as one. The more popular the remix is, the higher the chart position. In 1999, Mariah Carey's single "I Still Believe" came out with a remix featuring Da Brat and Krayzie Bone entitled "I Still Believe/Pure Imagination." Since it was an entirely different track from the original, it was considered to chart as a different entry. Conflict arose with her next remixes for singles "Heartbreaker" and "Thank God I Found You," which the former was said to be based on the original version, and the latter to only adapt the chorus of the original version as an adlib. "Thank God I Found You" was given an exception, since the remix version was entirely of a different structure and it no longer resembled the original recording.

The same trend followed in the 2000s, wherein Jennifer Lopez' remixes for "I'm Real" and "Ain't It Funny" topped the chart. Both the original versions of the song were able to chart during its release, but their follow-up remixes were of higher popularity and airplay. "Ain't It Funny" peaked at #10 and one year later, the remix version topped the charts. The original version of "I'm Real" also topped the charts in 2001, and when sales started to decline, the remix version was released and was enabled to chart as a different single. This made history as "I'm Real" became the first song with both the original version and remix version staying at the chart at the same time, as well as both versions being able to top the charts as well.

An arising conflict fell once again when Britney Spears released "Overprotected" in 2002. In January, the album version (or more commonly known as the "International Version") of the song was released and peaked at #3. After "I'm Not A Girl, Not Yet A Woman," which topped the charts that year, the "Darkchild Remix" was released in the US. Considering that the song resembled the original structure and melody of the song, it was at first, prohibited to chart. The video was extensively played on MTV Non-Stop Hits, but never charted. Extreme airplay and viewer requests increased at the hype of the video's popularity, giving it enough points to break in the Top 20. Considering the fact that it was a North American release, and the song was commercially viable, it was finally enabled to chart. Surprisingly, the song peaked #2, one notch higher than the placement of its original version. Spears became the second artist (and the third instance) to which both the original version and remix version were able to chart in the countdown.

Edited Videos
Video editing has been the most controversial act imposed by MTV Asia. It rarely happens but once it is imposed on a video, it is never revoked. Videos are edited for several reasons. Nudity, explicit viewing content, and violence are certain examples of reasons for editing videos. The first video to be edited was "Thank U" by Alanis Morissette. In the video, Alanis is nude, but her private parts aren't shown in the video. However, this has been marred too explicit especially to the younger generation, and other religious sects in Asia. An edited version of the video was released, covering almost the whole screen except for Morissette's face. "Thank U" topped the chart in early 1999.

Another video that was edited is George Michael's "Outside." Due to its sexual content, it was never fully shown on MTV. Even when it charted, only about 57 seconds of the video were shown due to enormous sexual content.

The most controversial video to have been extensively edited by the network was "Dirrty" by Christina Aguilera. In the part where Aguilera is in a boxing ring with her dancers at the beginning, a Thai poster is situated at the background while the dance is shown. Depicted in Thai language in the poster were the words "Thai Sex Tourism" and "Young Underage Girls." The video was banned in Thailand but in other parts of Asia, the dance sequence in the beginning were shortened. A live version of the video was mostly played. Regardless of the video's limited release, the song still topped the charts.

After the video for "Dirrty," Aguilera drew more controversy with her next single "Beautiful". In the video, two men were seen kissing each other and were deemed too racy for MTV viewers. Again, MTV Asia edited the video by completely removing the gay scenes out of the video. "Beautiful" became her next number one single and the edited version was played throughout MTV Asia.

Records

Asian Breakthrough
 The first artist to enter the Asia Hitlist was Singaporean violinist Vanessa-Mae. "Storm" peaked at #10 in 1997. Her next single "I Feel Love" peaked at #4 the same year.
 Malaysian act KRU entered the charts in 1998 with the single "The Way We Jam." The song peaked at #3.
 Indonesian artist Anggun was the first Asian artist to top the charts in 1998. "Snow On The Sahara" spent 2 weeks at #1.
 Filipino band and MTV Video Music Award winner Eraserheads, entered the charts in 1997 with "Ang Huling El Bimbo." The song peaked at #6 due to its strong performance resulting from their win at the MTV Video Music Awards in New York. In 1998, "Julie Tearjerky" peaked at #16.
 Hong Kong-born Asian superstar of Chinese-Indonesian ancestry Coco Lee topped the charts in 1999 with the single "Before I Fall In Love." Her next two singles, "Do You Want My Love" and "Wherever You Go," peaked at #2 and #3 respectively.
 American-born singer/songwriter of Dutch-Indonesian descent Michelle Branch entered the chart in 2002 with her single The Game of Love with Santana and peaked #2.
 Filipino-American apl.de.ap or Allan Pineda Lindo, a member of The Black Eyed Peas had hits of his own. "The APL Song" debuted at #11, the highest for an Asian artist, and peaked at #5. His next solo single "Bebot," peaked at #3 in 2006.
 Thailand's Tata Young entered the charts in 2004, becoming the first pure Asian artist to enter after nearly four years. "Sexy Naughty Bitchy" peaked at #4 and "I Believe" peaked at #10.
 Cassie, a female singer of Filipino and African-American descent, peaked at #2 with "Me & U" in 2006. "Long Way 2 Go" peaked at #7 in the same year.
 Filipino-German and Pussycat Dolls lead singer Nicole Scherzinger topped the charts alongside rap mogul Diddy in 2006 with "Come to Me" for 3 weeks.
 Half-Filipino and half-British singer Mutya Buena, formerly of the Sugababes, entered the charts with "Real Girl" in 2007.

1990s
 Celine Dion " My Heart Will Go On" #1 for 11 weeks
 The highest debut was "Thank U" by the Alanis Morissette. The song debuted at #7 during 1998.
 Both Elton John and the Spice Girls have the longest running single in the Top 20. "Candle In The Wind" (1997) and "2 Become 1" (1996) spent 21 weeks in the charts.

2000s
The Backstreet Boys' hit single Shape of My Heart became one of the longest reigning songs in the number one spot in 2001 although the song was released one year earlier.
 Mandy Moore was the first female artist to occupy the Top 3 positions at the same week. "Cry," "Someday We'll Know," and "Only Hope" occupied the Top 3 positions in 2002. All three singles managed to top the charts as well.
 JoJo is the youngest artist to enter the charts. "Leave (Get Out)" (2004) was released when she was only 13 years of age. The song peaked at #3. Her next single "Baby It's You" featuring Bow Wow peaked at #2. "Too Little Too Late" (2006) also peaked at #2 while she was 15.

External links

 Official site
 MTV Asia Top 100 2008
 MTV US

1990s music television series
1996 television series debuts
2000s music television series
2005 television series endings
MTV original programming
Music chart television shows